is a feminine Japanese given name. Its most common translation is "spring child" (春子, which may also be read as a Korean name Chun-ja), though other kanji provide different meanings. Notable people with the name include:

 Princess Haruko (春子), the first daughter of Emperor Tsuchimikado
 Haruko Arimura (born 1970), politician
 Haruko Hatoyama (1863–1938), Japanese educator
, Japanese actress
, Japanese badminton player
, Japanese politician 
Haruko Momma, Japanese philologist 
 Haruko Momoi (桃井はるこ, born 1977), a religious historian
Haruko Nawata Ward (1922–2015), Japanese actress
, Japanese actress
 Haruko Saida, women's professional shogi player
 Haruko Sugimura (杉村春子, 1909–1997), Japanese actress
 Haruko Obokata (小保方晴子, born 1983), Japanese biological scientist
, Japanese figure skating coach
Haruko Okano (born 1945), Japanese-Canadian artist
, Japanese manga artist 
Haruko Tanaka (1974-2019), Los Angeles-based artist
, Japanese academic
, Japanese politician
 the personal name of Empress Shōken

Fictional characters
Haruko Akagi, a character in the manga series Slam Dunk
Haruko Haruhara, a character in the anime series FLCL
 Haruko Kamio, a character in the visual novel Air
Haruko Mikogami, a secondary character in the anime series Sky Girls
Haruko Shido, a supporting character in the anime series Please Twins!

Japanese feminine given names